Harald Norden (born 15 December 1933) is a German former speed skater. He competed in the men's 1500 metres event at the 1960 Winter Olympics.

References

External links
 

1933 births
Living people
German male speed skaters
Olympic speed skaters of the United Team of Germany
Speed skaters at the 1960 Winter Olympics
People from Bad Frankenhausen
Sportspeople from Thuringia
20th-century German people